The Wiggles Movie is a 1997 Australian children's musical comedy film produced by 20th Century Fox and Gladusaurus Productions. Released in Australia on 18 December 1997, it is the only theatrical feature-length film starring the Wiggles. The story features amateur magician Wally the Great (Tony Harvey) trying to become a better magician by stealing Greg's magic wand, but is confronted by Dorothy the Dinosaur who believes the Wiggles have forgotten her birthday, while they have actually been planning a surprise party.

The film was released in North America as a direct-to-video film in 2003 from HIT Entertainment, under the title Magical Adventure! A Wiggly Movie.

Plot
Wally the Great (Tony Harvey), great-grandson of Waldo the Magnificent, is an amateur magician whose dream is to win the competition at the Magic Club for Best Magician. He is confronted with a rival, Roland the Remarkable (Dale Burridge), who believes Wally is a nobody. Meanwhile, children's entertainers the Wiggles, consisting of lead singer Greg Page, guitarist Murray Cook, drummer Anthony Field and keyboardist Jeff Fatt, are performing at a nearby school for Dorothy the Dinosaur's birthday. Mrs. Bingle (Joanne Samuel), the principal, has an incident with Anthony after she blows a whistle, causing him to act extremely silly. Wally, watching from behind a wall, sees Dorothy herself laying Greg's (who is a magician) wand on a table while sulking that everyone has forgotten her birthday but really they were trying to keep the surprise party for her a secret. Wally quickly snatches it but is caught by Dorothy. The two have a tug of war and the wand breaks in half. Meanwhile, the Wiggles decide to go out looking for Dorothy in their Big Red Car.

After seeing Henry the Octopus and his Underwater Big Band, they happen upon Brrrrrrrrrr Street where they get frozen; since they have no luck finding Dorothy, they go to Wigglehouse. Meanwhile, the wand is broken to bits after an accident with Wags the Dog and his pups. During the adventures that Wally and Dorothy have, their friendship grows more and more. When they visit Captain Feathersword the Friendly Pirate, a crew member falls in the water and Wally saves him and is rewarded a medal with a mini feathersword planted on it. Dorothy leaves and sits on a bench, sadly, complaining to Wally that nobody remembers her birthday. Wally then says "I didn't forget your birthday" which makes Dorothy a little bit better. Wally begins to daydream about his grandfather, Waldo, saying to him to believe in himself. Wally forgets all about the Magic Competition and is almost late, but thanks to Dorothy, he makes it. Jimbo the Juggler blocks their way and say that Wally should put his vehicle in the full car park, but Wally thinks quick and says "You find a spot" and tosses his helmet at him, leaving Jimbo pinch-faced. He then signs in and runs into Roland, who clearly amuses the judges when his score is 9–9–9.

Wally find his grandfather's old chest of magic supplies and grows confident in himself. Meanwhile, the Wiggles are waiting for Dorothy to come to the party but nobody shows up. After Wally does his magic act, the judges score him 10–9–9. He wins the competition which leaves Roland jealous but at the same time impressed. Wally takes Dorothy to her party when it is just about to be cancelled and the party begins. Dorothy is proud that she has found a new friend and that her friends have remembered her birthday.

Cast

 Murray Cook as Murray Wiggle
 Jeff Fatt as Jeff Wiggle
 Greg Page as Greg Wiggle
 Anthony Field as Anthony Wiggle
 Tony Harvey as Wally the Great

 Leeanne Ashley as Dorothy the Dinosaur
 Carolyn Ferrie as Dorothy's voice
 Paul Paddick as Captain Feathersword. Paddick also plays Wags the Dog and some other characters.
 Joanne Samuel as Mrs. Rosemary Bingle

Production

The Wiggles Movie was filmed over five weeks. The budget was estimated to be .

The Wiggles mentioned that they had forfeited a performance fee so they could ensure the movie made a profit. When it was shown in theatres, Australian cinemas were concerned about profits as they had not charged children under 3 years of age and that was half of their audience. It still made a profit on video.

Release
The film premiered in Australia on 18 December 1997, and in New Zealand in April 1998.

The film was released on VHS by 20th Century Fox Home Entertainment in June 1998. It included an introductory message by the Wiggles before the start of the film. In New Zealand, the film was released in October 1998. In North America, the film was retitled Magical Adventure! A Wiggly Movie and was released on VHS and DVD on 4 February 2003. The Australian DVD, released on 12 November 2003, is presented in 1.33:1 format. It features an animated short story, "The Lost Joey", and a photo montage presentation. According to Screen Australia, the video release of the film ranked number 17 in 2011 DVD sales; 15 in 2010; 11 in 2008; 13 in 2007; and 15 in 2005.

Reception
The film was the highest-grossing locally produced film during 1998 with a gross of $2.7 million.

Soundtrack

Other media

References

External links

 
 The Wiggles Movie at Oz Movies 
 
 The Wiggles Movie at Screen Australia

1997 films
1990s children's films
1990s musical films
Australian children's musical films
Australian children's comedy films
Australian children's adventure films
1990s English-language films
The Wiggles
Films about cephalopods
Films about dinosaurs
Films about dogs
Pirate films
Puppet films
Films shot in Sydney
20th Century Fox films
Mattel Creations films